Christopher de Almeida Pilar, known as Christopher (born 29 March 1985) is a French retired football player.

Club career
He made his professional debut in the Segunda Liga for União da Madeira on 22 September 2011 in a game against Trofense.

References

1985 births
Sportspeople from Dijon
Living people
French footballers
French people of Portuguese descent
S.C.U. Torreense players
C.S. Marítimo players
C.F. União players
Liga Portugal 2 players
G.D. Ribeirão players
Association football goalkeepers
French expatriate sportspeople in Portugal
Expatriate footballers in Portugal
French expatriate footballers
Footballers from Bourgogne-Franche-Comté